The Caproni Vizzola F.4 was an Italian fighter aircraft prototype that was designed in 1937 and built from 1939. It was a single-seat, low-wing cantilever monoplane with retractable landing gear.

Development
The F.4 was developed in parallel with the Caproni Vizzola F.5, with which it shared a common airframe. Design began in late 1937 by a team led by F. Fabrizi. The aircraft had a welded steel-tube fuselage and a wooden wing; the fuselage was covered with flush-riveted duralumin, while the wing had a stressed plywood skin.

This gave the F.4 project a new lease on life, as the Air Ministry approved of its use in fighters. The last of 12 pre-production F.5 aircraft ordered for the Regia Aeronautica (Italian Royal Air Force) was selected for conversion into the F.4 prototype, powered by the DB 601A. It flew for the first time in July 1940.

No further F.4s were ordered, and a proposal to build a production model powered by an Alfa Romeo-built DB 601A as the F.5bis was dropped in favor of pursuing development of the more advanced Caproni Vizzola F.6M.

Operational history
The Regia Aeronautica assigned the lone F.4 prototype to the 303ª Squadriglia, which operated it experimentally during 1942.

Operators

Regia Aeronautica

Variants
F.4
Prototype with German-built Daimler-Benz DB 601A engine

Specifications (F.4)

See also

Notes

References

Green, William, and Gordon Swanborough. The Complete Book of Fighters: An Illustrated Encyclopedia of Every Fighter Aircraft Built and Flown. New York: SMITHMARK Publishers, 1994. .
 Thompson, Jonathan. Italian Civil and Military Aircraft 1930-1945. Aero Publishing Inc. United States of America. 

Vizzola F.4
Low-wing aircraft
World War II Italian fighter aircraft
1940s Italian fighter aircraft
Single-engined tractor aircraft